Diphenolic acid is a carboxylic acid with molecular formula C17H18O4.  Its IUPAC name is 4,4-bis(4-hydroxyphenyl)pentanoic acid, and it can be prepared by the condensation reaction of phenol with levulinic acid in the presence of hydrochloric acid.  The equation for this synthesis is:
2 C6H5OH + CH3C(O)CH2CH2COOH → CH3C(p-C6H4OH)2CH2CH2COOH + H2O
Diphenolic acid is a solid at room temperature, melting at 168–171 °C and boiling at 507 °C.  According to its MSDS, diphenolic acid is soluble in ethanol, isopropanol, acetone, acetic acid, and methyl ethyl ketone, but insoluble in benzene, carbon tetrachloride, and xylene.

Diphenolic acid may be a suitable replacement for bisphenol A as a plasticizer.

Diphenolate esters have been used to synthesize epoxy resins as a replacement for the diglycidyl ether of bisphenol A.The diglycidyl ethers of n-alkyl diphenolate esters have similar thermomechanical properties to the diglycidyl ether of bisphenol A when cured, but the viscosity and glass transition temperature vary as a function of the ester length. Diphenolate esters have also been used to synthesize polycarbonates with a potential for water solubility.

References

External links
Material Safety Data Sheet for diphenolic acid

Phenols
Carboxylic acids